The Kelvin Formation is a geologic formation in Utah. It preserves dinosaur fossil eggs dating back to the Aptian to Albian stages of the Cretaceous period.

See also 
 List of fossiliferous stratigraphic units in Utah
 Paleontology in Utah

References

Bibliography 
 

Geologic formations of Utah
Lower Cretaceous Series of North America
Cretaceous geology of Utah
Albian Stage
Aptian Stage
Conglomerate formations
Ooliferous formations
Paleontology in Utah